Saint-Valère is a municipality located in the Centre-du-Québec region of Quebec, Canada. it's population is 1,118 as of the 2021 census.

References

Municipalities in Quebec
Incorporated places in Centre-du-Québec
Canada geography articles needing translation from French Wikipedia